In mathematics, in the area of potential theory, a Lebesgue spine or Lebesgue thorn is a type of set used for discussing solutions to the Dirichlet problem and related problems of potential theory. The Lebesgue spine was introduced in 1912 by Henri Lebesgue to demonstrate that the Dirichlet problem does not always have a solution, particularly when the boundary has a sufficiently sharp edge protruding into the interior of the region.

Definition 

Observations 

References 

 J. L. Doob. Classical Potential Theory and Its Probabilistic Counterpart, Springer-Verlag, Berlin Heidelberg New York, .
 L. L. Helms (1975). Introduction to potential theory. R. E. Krieger .

Potential theory